Luigi Falcone (born 26 May 1992) is an Italian footballer. He plays for  club Trapani.

Club career
Born in Mesagne, Apulia, Falcone started his career at Apulia team Lecce. Falcone was a member of the reserve from 2009 to 2012 but already made his reserve debut during 2007–08 season. Although U.S. Lecce was relegated to Serie B, Falcone also left the club to seek first team experience, for Serie B newcomer Lanciano. Lecce later relegated again due to 2011–12 Italian football scandal.

Falcone made his competitive debut for his new club in 2012–13 Coppa Italia, scoring a goal against Crotone. On 25 August 2012, Falcone played his first Serie B match against Calcio Padova.

On 3 July 2019, he signed with Pistoiese.

On 24 July 2022, Falcone joined Serie D side Trapani.

International career
Falcone received his first call-up in August for a tournament in England. He made his debut in Saarland Under-17 Quadrangular Tournament in September. He did not play any game in qualifying but selected as one of the backup of 2009 UEFA European Under-17 Football Championship, due to the injury of fellow Lecce player Alessandro Scialpi. He was a backup player again in October 2009 for 2009 FIFA U-17 World Cup. Falcone played the last U18 match in 2009–10 season against Belarus in May 2010. He did not receive any U19 call-up. In August 2011 Falcone was recalled. He received a call-up from Luigi Di Biagio in August 2011 to replace injured Nicolao Dumitru. He played 3 times for Italy in U20 Four Nations, scored once against Switzerland. He also played against Ghana as well as unofficial friendlies against Under-21 "B" and against Serie D representatives. He also received call-up in the new season against Turkey but did not play on 5 September. On 7 September 2012 he was dropped from the squad in favor of born 1993 players.

References

External links
 Football.it Profile 
 
 FIGC 

1992 births
Footballers from Apulia
People from Mesagne
Sportspeople from the Province of Brindisi
Living people
Italian footballers
Association football forwards
U.S. Lecce players
S.S. Virtus Lanciano 1924 players
S.S.D. Varese Calcio players
U.S. Viterbese 1908 players
U.S. Catanzaro 1929 players
U.S. Pistoiese 1921 players
Taranto F.C. 1927 players
Trapani Calcio players
Serie B players
Serie C players
Serie D players